Psiadia, commonly known as daisy trees, is a genus of mostly woody Asian and African plants in the tribe Astereae within the family Asteraceae. The genus is distributed throughout the Western Indian Ocean, with species reported from continental Eastern Africa, Madagascar, Mauritius, La Reunion, Rodrigues, the Comoro islands, as well as several of the smaller, uninhabited islands in the Mozambique Channel. Additional species are suspected on Socotra and Sri Lanka, but these have not been confirmed. Phylogenetic studies using DNA sequence data and biogeographic reconstruction using molecular dating have shown that the genus originated on the African mainland, and colonized Madagascar and the outlying islands in the Indian Ocean in several independent instances of overwater dispersal in the Miocene.

Species

 Formerly included
see: Conyza Microglossa Pluchea

References 

 
Asteraceae genera
Taxonomy articles created by Polbot